The list presents the largest LGBT events (pride parades and festivals) worldwide by attendance. Statistics are announced both by the organizers and authorities (police). In this table, the largest single event by city as well as notable international events such as WorldPride or Europride are indicated. Only referenced statistics are accepted. National parades, usually held in the national capital, are generally further supported by nationwide LGBT associations and medias. Certain statistics may include celebrations or festivals that may be exclusive of the parade.

As of June 2019, the NYC Pride March in New York City is consistently North America's biggest pride parade, with 2.1 million attendees in 2015 and 2.5 million in 2016; in 2018, attendance was estimated around two million. During Stonewall 50 – WorldPride NYC 2019, five million took part over the final weekend, with an estimated four million in attendance at the parade. In 2022, the most recent NYC Pride March event took place. 

The São Paulo Gay Pride Parade in Brazil is South America's largest event, and is listed by Guinness World Records as the world's largest Pride parade starting in 2006 with 2.5 million people. It broke the Guinness record in 2009 with four million attendees,  with similar numbers to at least 2016, and up to five million attending in 2017. As of 2019, it has three to five million each year.

The Tokyo Rainbow Pride in Japan is one of Asia's largest events. The most recent Tokyo Rainbow Pride event was held on April 23 and 24, 2022.

Pride Toronto is the largest pride event in Canada. It is held every June.

As of June 2019, the largest LGBTQ events in other parts of the world include:
 in Europe: Madrid Pride, Orgullo Gay de Madrid (MADO), with 3.5 million attendees when it hosted WorldPride in 2017
 in Asia: Taiwan Pride in Taipei; 
 in the Middle East: Tel Aviv Pride in Israel; 
 in Oceania: Sydney Mardi Gras Parade in Australia;
 in Africa: Johannesburg Pride in South Africa

Brooklyn Liberation March, the largest transgender rights demonstration in LGBTQ history, took place on June 14, 2020, stretching from Grand Army Plaza to Fort Greene, Brooklyn in New York City, and focused on supporting Black transgender lives, drawing an estimated 15,000 to 20,000 participants.

On September 7, 2019, London hosted the largest ever Bi Pride celebration, Bi Pride UK, with more than 1,300 people in attendance.

All time statistics

See also
List of LGBT events
List of LGBT awareness periods

References

Largest
LGBT events